The South Tyrolian People's Bank (known as Volksbank or Banca Popolare) is an Italian bank headquartered in Bolzano. The bank was originated as cooperative bank, but demututalized in 2016.

The bank was the second largest bank in Trentino – South Tyrol with a market share of 8.8%. After the merger with Banca Popolare di Marostica in 2014, it was expected that the bank was the seventh bank in Veneto with a market share of 3.2% (Behind Intesa Sanpaolo, UniCredit, Banca MPS, Banco Popolare, BPVicenza and Veneto Banca) and more specifically 6.2% in the Province of Vicenza as the 6th. After the announcement of the proposed merger of BPVicenza and Veneto Banca in 2017, Volksbank – Banca Popolare would increased in ranking in the Veneto region.

As at 31 December 2016, the bank had 79 branches in Trentino – South Tyrol, 102 branches in Veneto and 3 branches in Friuli (all in the Province of Pordenone).

History
It was established in 1992 through the merger of two South Tyrolian cooperative banks, Volksbank Bozen – Banca Popolare di Bolzano from Bolzano (found 1902 as Spar-und Vorschuß-Casse für Handel und Gewerbe) and Volksbank Brixen – Banca Popolare di Bressanone (found 1889 as Spar-und Darlehenskassenverein für die Pfarrgemeinde Brixen) from Brixen. In 1995 it acquired another South Tyrolian cooperative bank Volksbank Meran – Banca Popolare di Merano (found 1886 as Gewerbliche Spar-und Vorschuß-Casse) headquartered in Merano. The bank's primary markets are the two autonomous provinces of South Tyrol (63 branches) and Trentino (20 branches), as of 2014. In recent years it has been aggressively expanding into the neighboring Veneto region with 102 branches in 5 provinces (by absorbing Venetian banks Banca Popolare di Marostica in 2014 and its subsidiary Banca di Treviso). The bank has also expanded its operations to the Friuli sub-region in the Province of Pordenone. In addition to the province of origin, the bank is present in much of north-eastern Italy, particularly in the provinces of Trento, Belluno, Treviso, Vicenza, Padua, Venice, Udine and Pordenone for a total (at the end of 2021) of 180 branches, over 1,300 collaborators and about 280,000 customers.

References

External links 
  
  

Banks of Italy
Banks established in 1992
1992 establishments in Italy
Companies based in South Tyrol
Bolzano
Former cooperative banks of Italy